Raisinghnagar is a town and a municipality (Tehsil) in Sri Ganganagar district in the Indian state of Rajasthan. The town is surrounded by fertile land.

It also corresponds to the Raisinghnagar constituency in the Rajasthan Assembly.

Demography 
In the 2011 India census, the town of Raisinghnagar had a population of 28,330. Males constituted 53.25% (15085) of the population and females 46.75% (13245). In 2011, Raisinghnagar had an average literacy rate of above 72.08% (20423).

Earlier Raisinghnagar was known as Panwarsar. It is located 200 km North-west of Bikaner and about 465 km from the capital of India, Delhi. The town is located at a distance of only 10 km from the India-Pakistan border.

District headquarters Sriganganagar is towards NE direction at approximately 70 km, small town named Gajsinghpur is north approximately 13 km. Vijaynagar town is in south direction approximately 30 km, Anupgarh town is approximately 50 km in SW direction.

Language

Economy
The economy of Raisinghnagar is dependent on agriculture in the surrounding area.

Religion
Most people of Raisinghnagar practice Hinduism and Sikhism with some population of Muslims.

A small population of approx 30 families (200 people) are following Jainism (Terapanth).

Climate
The climate of Raisinghnagar varies to extreme limits. The summer temperature reaches up to 50° Celsius and winter temperature dips just around −1° Celsius. The average annual rainfall is above .

References

Cities and towns in Sri Ganganagar district